William Bowyer (19 December 169913 November 1777) was an English printer known as "the learned printer".

Life
Born in London, Bowyer was educated at St John's College, Cambridge, and in 1722 became a partner in his father William Bowyer's business. In 1729 he was appointed printer of the votes of the British House of Commons, and in 1736 printer to the Society of Antiquaries, of which he was elected a fellow in 1737. He was also appointed printer to the Society for the Encouragement of Learning. On the death of his father in 1737 he became the sole owner of the Bowyer press.

In 1759 he took as apprentice John Nichols, who was to be his successor and biographer. Bowyer was also a close collaborator with the prominent London bookseller Andrew Millar.

In 1761 Bowyer became printer to the Royal Society, and in 1767 printer of the rolls of the House of Lords and the journals of the House of Commons. Also in 1767 he moved from Whitefriars to a larger house in Red Lion Passage, Fleet Street. He died leaving unfinished a number of large works and among them the reprint of Domesday Book. He was known as "the learned printer."

Bowyer was buried in Leyton parish church, where he has a monument.

Works
Bowyer's major work was an edition of the New Testament in Greek, with notes. He wrote tracts and pamphlets, and edited, arranged and published a host of books. He also edited the Greek-Latin Lexicon of Schrevelius.

Legacy
Bowyer's generous bequests in favour of indigent printers were administered by the Stationers' Company, of which he became a liveryman in 1738. In their hall was his portrait bust and a painting of his father.

Notes

References
Millar, Andrew, Letter to Andrew Mitchell, 26 August 1766, accessed through "www.millar-project.ed.ac.uk." University of Edinburgh.

External links 

 William Bowyer Papers. James Marshall and Marie-Louise Osborn Collection, Beinecke Rare Book and Manuscript Library, Yale University.

1699 births
1777 deaths
Alumni of St John's College, Cambridge
Businesspeople from London
English printers